Martha Ittuluka'naaq (1912–1981) was an Inuit artist known for her drawings and prints.

Her work is included in the collections of the National Gallery of Canada and the McMichael Canadian Art Collection.

References

 1912 births
 1981 deaths
20th-century Canadian artists
20th-century Canadian women artists
Inuit artists